Tower Creek is a stream in the U.S. state of Idaho. It is a tributary of the Salmon River.

Tower Creek was named for towering rock formations along its course. A variant name was "Boyle Creek".

References

Rivers of Lemhi County, Idaho
Rivers of Idaho